Harworth is an area in the civil parish of Harworth Bircotes (with Bircotes) in the Bassetlaw district in Nottinghamshire, England, on the border with South Yorkshire. The population of the civil parish was 7,948 in the 2011 Census.

History 

The Harworth coal mine opened in 1921 and produced coal for the power stations on the River Trent. A new pit tower was built in 1989 when the pit was at its peak of production but seven years later the colliery was 'mothballed'. In 2015, it was announced that the pit tower would be demolished and the colliery site would be redeveloped for housing which has since been completed. The former freight line and sidings into the colliery have been lifted and left undeveloped. The local football team is called Harworth Colliery F.C.

Etymology
The town's name is from Old English har "grey" (compare modern hoary") and
worth (also worō, worþ) "enclosure". Harworth was recorded in the Domesday Book as Hareworde.

Notable people
The town – once a busy coalmining community – is particularly noteworthy as the home of Tom Simpson (1937–1967), one of Britain's greatest road racing cyclists, the World Champion in 1965. Simpson began his cycling career as a club member at Harworth and District Cycling Club. After his death on Mont Ventoux during the 1967 Tour de France, his body was brought back to Nottinghamshire and interred in Harworth's cemetery. A small museum dedicated to Simpson's achievements was opened in August 2001 and can be found in the Harworth and Bircotes sports and social club.

There is also a history of Gurkhas being here during the Second World War.

Author Lindsey Kelk hails from Harworth, and attended North Border Comprehensive School from 1992-99.

Schools
There is a Church of England primary School in Harworth (Harworth Church of England Academy) and a Catholic primary school in Bircotes (St Patrick's Catholic Primary School). The town is also served by Serlby Park Academy, a 3–18 school in Bircotes.

Places of worship
The Anglican parish church of All Saints is grade II listed and dates in part to the 12th century.

Harworth Methodist Church is a red brick building in Bircotes, having been built as a facility for the 1920s mining population.

St Patrick's Catholic Church was a wooden building built in the 1930s and included the stations of the cross carved in coal. It closed at Easter 2018, and the parish merged with that of St Helen, Oldcotes which later formed part of the parish of St Jude, Worksop.

Listed buildings in Harworth

All Saints Church, the war memorial, and six properties in Main Street, Harworth (three barns and three houses) are grade II listed buildings.

References

External links

UK Coal Harworth
Harworth pit to close in 2006.
 
Harworth & Bircotes Neighbourhood Development Plan 2015 – 2028
Understanding Harworth & Bircotes: Harworth & Bircotes Neighbourhood Development Plan 2014 - 2028

Villages in Nottinghamshire
Bassetlaw District